The Marvel Experience, or The Marvel Experience: The World's First Hyper-Reality Tour, is a mobile interactive attraction featuring Marvel's characters run by Hero Ventures.

History
As early as 2011, Hero Ventures had approached Marvel Entertainment about a traveling attraction. A seven-figure upfront licensing fee with 15% median royalty (range of 10% to 20%) was agreed upon. Hero Venture then sought out additional funding for the project.

Marvel Entertainment started their project in 1939, and since then, they have created 29 films with an overall budget passing 27,5 billion dollars.

On August 22, 2013, Marvel Entertainment announced that it was working with Hero Ventures on The Marvel Experience, a traveling production/attraction.

On January 9, 2014, Hero Ventures unveiled the dome design image. On October 10, tickets went on sale. A preview of the Experience was scheduled for Phoenix from December 12-January 3, 2015, then officially premiering on January 9, 2015, in Dallas.

Due to popular demand at the time, Hero Ventures announced that the stay in San Diego would be extended until March 1, 2015, while heading to Chicago with its opening on April 2. Instead, the show was reworked. The tour went to Philadelphia with plans to go to Chicago, New York, and St. Louis. In July, Hero Ventures announced that the show's summer tour would end early after its three-week run in Philadelphia. While no reason was given for the early end of the tour, refunds were to be issued for prepaid tickets.

Tour

Each tour stop lasts from 17 to 24 days. Each location of the attraction is expected to cost $2.5 million which will be offset by ticket, merchandise, and concession sales on a rented 2-acre lot. The attraction is expected to handle a maximum of 10,000 visitors. There will be scheduled entry times for attendees at seven-minute intervals to avoid overcrowding.

Design
The $30 million attraction was designed with a dome complex two football fields in size, "4D motion ride", projected animation, motion comics, virtual reality and holographic simulations while including social media. Movie conceptual artist Aaron Sims was the designer on the attraction with Jerry Rees as director and VFX by Rhythm & Hues and Prana Studios.  Lexington Design + Fabrication produced the interactive elements. The mobile dome complex is designed to look like a  S.H.I.E.L.D. Mobile Command Center. Domes were chosen as to not have to rent existing facilities that take up to 25% of the ticket price. PVC resin, polymer, and other elements are used to construct the domes making them expensive, but should be offset by the saving on facility costs. Absolute Hollywood live event company designed the structures that are six stories tall.

Performance
Attendees will interact with several Marvel heroes and SHIELD agents during the two-hour performance in which they fight the forces of Hydra with a final battle against the Red Skull, MODOK, and their Adaptoids.

Kevin Smith was revealed in Del Mar, California as the voice of M.O.D.O.K. Producers Michael Cohl and Jeremiah J. Harris were involved in producing Spider-Man: Turn Off the Dark.

Hero Ventures

Hero Ventures, LLC is an entertainment company that produces traveling shows. The company is based in Westwood, Los Angeles.

Company history
In 2009, Rick Licht started working full-time on a yet unnamed venture which was his and Doug Schafer's business idea that they had been discussing over the years. In 2011, Licht was joined by Schaer as chief operating officer and Jason Rosen as chief production officer. Hero Ventures first approached the National Baseball Hall of Fame for a dome show, but was turned down. They then developed a new list of project partners that was topped with Marvel Entertainment, who agreed to a seven figure licensing deal for the movable dome show, which brought on Michael Cohl and Jesse Harris to pay the upfront fee.

Before the August 22, 2013 announcement of its first project, The Marvel Experience, the company received "A" round investment commitments from Steve Tisch, Roy P. Disney & Shamrock Holdings, Maurice & Paul Marciano, WWE, Vista Equity Partners president Brian Sheth, Ross Hilton Kemper, and Enlight Media to fund that project. This raised funding of $16.5 million allowing them to move into an office in Westwood, Los Angeles and start taking salaries. Additional funding came from advances on royalties from vendors and $10 million from co-production partners with some partners taking profit participation. With the announcement of Marvel Experience, several other IP holders started making inquires about doing similar projects for their properties, but HV held off on additional attractions until its current project was shown a success.

On October 10, 2014, The Marvel Experience tickets went on sale. In early December 2014, Magic Johnson was announced as an investor and member of its Board of Managers. A preview of the Experience was scheduled for Phoenix from December 12-January 3, 2015, then officially premiering on January 9, 2015, in Dallas.

See also
Iron Man Experience
Marvel Universe Live!
Marvel Super Heroes 4D
Spider-Man: Turn Off the Dark

References

External links

Hero Ventures

Works based on Marvel Comics
Amusement rides
Simulator rides